Edward Bigelow Jolliffe  (March 2, 1909 – March 18, 1998) was a Canadian social democratic politician and lawyer from Ontario. He was the first leader of the Ontario section of the Co-operative Commonwealth Federation (CCF) and leader of the Official Opposition in the Ontario Legislature during the 1940s and 1950s. He was a Rhodes Scholar in the mid-1930s, and came back to Canada to help the CCF, after his studies were complete and being called to the bar in England and Ontario. After politics, he  practised labour law in Toronto and would eventually become a labour adjudicator. In retirement, he moved to British Columbia, where he died in 1998.

Early life and education

His family had lived in Ontario for generations. His parents, the Reverend Charles and Gertrude Jolliffe, were missionaries for the Methodist Church of Canada, and were living near what was then known as Luchow, China. He was born at the Canadian Missionary hospital in Luchow, near Chunking on March 2, 1909. He was home-schooled in China by his mother until his early teens. When his family returned to Ontario, he attend Rockwood Public School and then went to high school at Guelph Collegiate Institute. He was an undergraduate at the University of Toronto's Victoria College, the United Church College. He became the head of the Victoria Student Council, and was a member of the Hart House Debates Committee. In 1930, he won the Maurice Cody scholarship, and then became one of Ontario's Rhodes Scholars that same year. He attended Christ Church, Oxford University for three years. As a member of Oxford's Labour Club, he met David Lewis, the club's leader and a fellow Canadian.  Together they fought the Communist Red October club and fascists such as Lord Haw-Haw–William Joyce. Both he and Lewis planned  a 'silent' protest at Joyce's February 1934 speech at Oxford.  They carefully made sure that enough members from the Labour Club attended the meeting, and then in groups of two or three, strategically walked out of the speech, across the creaking wooden floors, effectively blotting out Joyce's speech.  The Blackshirts in the audience then caused riots in the street after the meeting and Jolliffe and Lewis were in the thick of it.

His Oxford experiences made him a socialist and he joined the Co-operative Commonwealth Federation shortly after it was formed in 1932 during his summer vacation. He helped form an overseas branch of the CCF at Oxford that year. He was called to the bar in England, and was the first Canadian to win the Arden scholarship. When Jolliffe permanently returned from Oxford, he worked as the CCF's Ontario organizer and was called to the bar in Ontario and practised law in Toronto from 1938 onwards.

He was a candidate in the 1935 Canadian election in the Toronto riding of St. Paul's, placing fourth. He ran again in the 1940 federal election, this time in the York East electoral district. He was noted for calling out the former federal Conservative government for neglecting World War I soldiers on their return home, and that this time, "proper measures be taken to protect the future of Canadian soldiers and their dependents." He countered that a C.C.F. government would stop war profiteering and the protect the interests of the country's soldiers and "small taxpayers."  He was soundly defeated, like every other Ontario CCF candidate, placing a distant third.

Leader and 1943 election
He became the first leader of the Ontario CCF in 1942. The following year, he led the party to within five seats of victory with 34 seats and 32% of the vote in the election of 1943 that elected a Conservative minority government under George Drew. He won the York South seat, and became its Member of Provincial Parliament (MPP).

1945 "Gestapo" campaign
In the 1945 Ontario election, Drew ran an anti-Semitic, union bashing, Red-baiting campaign. The previous two years of anti-socialist attacks by the Conservatives and their supporters, like Gladstone Murray and Montague A. Sanderson, were devastatingly effective against the previously popular CCF. Much of the source material for the anti-CCF campaign  came from the Ontario Provincial Police(OPP)'s Special Investigation Branch's agent D-208: Captain William J. Osbourne-Dempster. His office was supposed to be investigating war-time 5th column saboteurs. Instead, starting in November 1943, he was investigating, almost exclusively, Ontario opposition MPPs, mainly focusing on the CCF caucus.  The fact that Jolliffe knew about these 'secret' investigations as early as February 1944 led to one of the most infamous incidents in 20th-century Canadian politics.

May 24, 1945 radio speech
As can be discerned from the previous description, the 1945 campaign was anything but genteel and polite. Jolliffe replied by giving a radio speech (written with the assistance of Lister Sinclair) that accused Drew of running a political Gestapo in Ontario. In the speech excerpt below, Jolliffe alleged that a secret department of the Ontario Provincial Police was acting as a political police – spying on the opposition and the media.

The dramatic tone of the speech is Sinclair's, as at the time, he was a dramatist, mostly writing for the Canadian Broadcasting Corporation (CBC). At the time, there was speculation among CCF supporters as to whether or not the speech damaged the party's reputation.  But as Gerald Caplan maintains in his book The Dilemma of Canadian Socialism, the CCF was already at 21 percent in popular support in the Gallop poll just prior to the speech. On election day, they received 22 percent of the popular vote, so at best it added an extra percentage point of support. At worst, it didn't have an effect, which is highly unlikely.

Jolliffe's inflammatory speech became the main issue of the campaign, and dominated coverage in the media for the rest of the election. Drew, and his Attorney-General Leslie Blackwell vehemently denied Jolliffe's accusations, but the public outcry was too much for them to abate. On May 28, 1945, they appointed a Royal Commission to investigate these charges.  Jolliffe's CCF and the Ontario Liberal party wanted the election suspended until the Commission tabled its report.  Drew ignored these requests and continued to hold the election on its original date, despite it being many months before the Commission's findings could be made available.

Election Day, June 4, 1945
Jolliffe's CCF went from 34 seats to 8, but almost garnering the same number of actual votes cast, though their percentage of the popular vote dropped from 32 to 22 percent.  Drew, with his attack campaign, successfully drove the voter turn-out up, thereby driving the CCF's percentage and seat totals down.

Monday, June 4, 1945, was one of Ontario's  most important elections in the 20th century according to Caplan and David Lewis. It shaped the province for the next 40 years, as the Conservatives won a massive majority in the Legislature, and would remain in government for the next 40 consecutive years.

After going from 34 seats to 8, as Caplan puts it, "June 4 and June 11 [federal election], 1945, proved to be black days in CCF annuals: Socialism was effectively removed from the Canadian political agenda." The CCF would never fully recover from this defeat and would eventually cease as a party and morph into the Ontario New Democratic Party. Only then, and in the 1970s, did a social democratic party attain the popularity it had under Jolliffe in 1943.

For Ted Jolliffe, another election consequence was his tenure as the MPP from York South ended, at least for the time being.  He lost the election but did better than any other CCF candidate in Toronto or in the outlying Yorks.

LeBel Royal Commission

Drew appointed Justice A.M. LeBel as the Royal Commissioner. His terms of reference were restricted to the question of whether Drew was personally responsible for the establishment of "a secret political police organization, for the purpose of collecting, by secret spying, material to be used in attempt to keep him in power." Wider questions like why the OPP, Ontario Civil Servants, were keeping files on MPPs were not allowed.

Jolliffe would act as his own counsel throughout the commission, but was assisted by fellow CCF lawyer, Andrew Brewin.  Both he and Brewin were able to establish, from several eyewitnesses, that agent D-208, Dempster, was spying on the CCF.  What they could not prove, because they did not have access to the information in 1945, were the letters that Drew wrote to his supporter M.A. (Bugsy) Sanderson suggesting that he would finance any lawsuits or other charges stemming from the  information provided by Dempster in his advertisements. Sanderson was, in late 1943 to 1945, along with Gladstone Murray, leading the libelous advertisement campaigns against the CCF in newspapers and bill-boards, with information gleaned from Dempster's briefings. Jolliffe presented several witnesses that claimed to have seen these documents. But Jolliffe could not produce the actual letter, and Drew would deny ever writing it.

On October 11, 1945, Justice LeBel issued his report that essentially exonerated Drew and Blackwell. Due to Jolliffe presenting only circumstantial evidence that linked Drew to Dempster, Murray and Sanderson, the Commissioner found the information unconvincing, even though LeBel believed Dempster's interaction with Sanderson and Murray was inappropriate.

Jolliffe's motives regarding his accusations, as well as his choice of words, would be questioned for many years afterwards. That would change. In the late 1970s, when David Lewis was doing research for his Memoirs he came across archival evidence proving the charge. Due to Lewis's discovery, Drew's son Edward, placed extremely restrictive conditions on his father's papers housed in the Public Archives of Canada that continue as of 2010.

As Lewis pointed out in his memoirs, "We found that Premier Drew and Gladstone Murray did not disclose all information to the Lebel Commission; indeed, they deliberately prevaricated throughout. The head of the Government of Ontario had given false witness under testimony.... The perpetrator of Ontario's Watergate got away with it."

Jolliffe faced a leadership challenge in 1946, but was re-elected CCF leader.

1948 re-elected MPP
As a result of the 1948 Ontario election, the CCF recovered, winning 21 seats. Jolliffe again became Leader of the Opposition in Ontario and Member of Provincial Parliament (MPP) for York South. In 1951, however, as a result of the Cold War and the "red scare", the CCF and labour movement acted to purge individuals (including CCF MPP Robert Carlin) suspected of being under Communist influence. Among the general public, support for socialism suffered: the CCF was reduced to only two seats in the 1951 election. Jolliffe lost his own seat and resigned as party leader in August 1953 in order to focus on his law practice.

Post MPP career
He returned to his previous career as a labour lawyer, founding the firm Jolliffe, Lewis and Osler with fellow CCF activist and future New Democratic Party leader, David Lewis in 1945. In the 1950s and 1960s, the firm assisted the United Steelworkers union in their fight with the Mine, Mill & Smelter Workers union in Sudbury, Ontario. In 1968, he was appointed Chief Adjudicator under the (federal) Public Service Staff Relations Act, a position he held until 1978. He then became active as a labour arbitrator until his retirement. In 1972, an historical novel he wrote, entitled The First Hundred, was published by McClelland and Stewart Limited.

Ted Jolliffe was the first social democratic leader of the opposition in Ontario's Legislature in 1943. He lived long enough to see Bob Rae and the NDP form the Ontario government in September 1990. He died on March 18, 1998, in Salt Spring Island, British Columbia.

Notes

References

Sources

External links 

1909 births
1998 deaths
Canadian socialists
Ontario Co-operative Commonwealth Federation MPPs
20th-century Canadian politicians
Leaders of the Ontario Co-operative Commonwealth Federation
University of Toronto alumni
Alumni of Christ Church, Oxford
Canadian Rhodes Scholars
Members of the United Church of Canada